Koto Shopno Koto Asha is a 2017 Bengali romance-action film written and directed by Wakil Ahmed and starring Pori Moni and Bappy Chowdhury. It began filming on 3 January 2016, and was released on 13 January 2017.

Cast 
 Bappy Chowdhury
 Pori Moni
 Subrata
 Rehana Jolly
 Shatabdi Wadud
 DJ Shohel
 Kamal Patekar
 Harun Kisinger

Production

Soundtrack 
 Imran
 Kona, 
 Monir Khan, 
 Nancy, 
 Kheya, Razib

References

Bengali-language Bangladeshi films
2010s Bengali-language films